The 1934 Chico State Wildcats football team represented Chico State Teachers College—now known as California State University, Chico—as a member of the Far Western Conference (FWC) during the 1934 college football season. Led by 12th-year head coach Art Acker, Chico State compiled an overall record of 4–3–1 with a mark of 2–1–1 in conference play, placing third in the FWC. The team outscored its opponents 73 to 40 for the season. The Wildcats played home games at College Field in Chico, California.

Schedule

Notes

References

Chico State
Chico State Wildcats football seasons
Chico State Wildcats football